Gunn Berit Gjerde (born 28 April 1954) is a Norwegian politician for the Liberal Party.

She serves as a deputy representative to the Norwegian Parliament from Møre og Romsdal during the term 2005–2009.

On the local level Gjerde was a member of Hareid municipality council from 1987 to 1991, and later served as mayor from 1999 to 2007.

References

1954 births
Living people
Deputy members of the Storting
Liberal Party (Norway) politicians
Mayors of places in Møre og Romsdal
Women mayors of places in Norway
Place of birth missing (living people)
People from Hareid
20th-century Norwegian women politicians
20th-century Norwegian politicians
Women members of the Storting